"It Hurts Me to My Heart" is a 1954 single by Faye Adams.  The song, written by Rose Marie McCoy and Charles Singleton, was the final of Adams's three number ones on the R&B Best Sellers chart in the United States.

References
 

1954 singles
Faye Adams songs
Songs written by Rose Marie McCoy
Songs written by Charles Singleton (songwriter)